Bishopthorpe Palace is a historic house at Bishopthorpe, to the south of York, in the City of York unitary authority and ceremonial county of North Yorkshire, England. It is situated on the River Ouse and is the official residence of the Archbishop of York. In the local area it is known as "the Archbishop's Palace".

Background
In 1226, Archbishop Walter de Gray bought the manor house at what was then St. Andrewthorpe and gave it to the Dean and Chapter of York Minster. Since then, the village became known as Bishopthorpe.  In 1241 he built a Manor House and Chapel on the site. A red brick north wing was built in the fifteenth century and the Gatehouse was built in 1765. In 1863, a water tower was built to extract  water from  a well, rather than using river water for drinking.  The tower was demolished in 1946 but some foundations are still visible in garden of Iona Lodge.

The palace is a Grade I listed building in a wooded, rural setting and includes a gatehouse, stables, a brewhouse and brewster's cottage. It was remodelled by Thomas Atkinson between 1763 and 1769.

Archbishop John Sentamu did not initially move into the palace, as it was just beginning a major renovation and restoration at the time.

References

External links 

Bishopthorpe Palace, The Archbishop of York

Country houses in North Yorkshire
Episcopal palaces of archbishops of York
Grade I listed buildings in York